The Panama Open was a golf tournament played from 1938 to 1982, during which time it was won by some of the biggest names in professional golf, including Sam Snead and Arnold Palmer. It was an event on the PGA-sponsored Caribbean Tour between 1958 and 1974. Following the demise of the Caribbean Tour the tournament was not played for several years, until there was a brief revival between 1979 and 1982.

The Panama Open was revived in 1996, when it was an unofficial event on the Canadian Tour; it became an official tournament in 2001 and 2002. In 2003, it was an event on the Tour de las Américas, and the following year, it was co-sanctioned by the European Challenge Tour (2005 season).

Winners

See also
Panama Championship

Notes

References

External links
Coverage on the European Tour's official site

Golf tournaments in Panama
Former Challenge Tour events
Former Tour de las Américas events
Recurring sporting events established in 1938
Recurring sporting events disestablished in 2004
1938 establishments in Panama